Neoclytus is a genus of beetles in the family Cerambycidae. They measure 4-20 mm. There are 93 species in the New World.

Species
These 58 species belong to the genus Neoclytus:

 Neoclytus acteon (Chevrolat, 1860) c g
 Neoclytus acuminatus (Fabricius, 1775) i c g b (red-headed ash borer)
 Neoclytus anama Galileo & Martins, 2007 c g
 Neoclytus angelicus Van Dyke, 1927 i c g
 Neoclytus approximatus (LeConte, 1862) i c g b
 Neoclytus araneiformis (Olivier, 1795) i c
 Neoclytus ascendens LeConte, 1878 i
 Neoclytus augusti (Chevrolat, 1835) i c g b
 Neoclytus bahamicus Cazier & Lacey, 1952 c g
 Neoclytus balteatus LeConte, 1873 i c g b
 Neoclytus beltianus Bates, 1885 c g
 Neoclytus cacicus (Chevrolat, 1860) c g
 Neoclytus caprea (Say, 1824) i c g b (banded ash borer)
 Neoclytus chevrolati (Castelnau & Gory, 1841) c g
 Neoclytus clavipes (Chevrolat, 1860) c g
 Neoclytus columbianus Fuchs, 1963
 Neoclytus conjunctus (LeConte, 1857) i c g b
 Neoclytus cordifer (Klug, 1829) i b (mangrove borer)
 Neoclytus curtulus (Chevrolat, 1860) c g
 Neoclytus englemani Giesbert, 1989 c g
 Neoclytus fraterculus Martins & Galileo, 2008 c g
 Neoclytus guianensis (Laporte & Gory, 1835)
 Neoclytus hoegei (Bates, 1880) c g
 Neoclytus horridus (LeConte, 1862) i c g b
 Neoclytus impar (Germar, 1824) c g
 Neoclytus interruptus LeConte, 1873 i c g
 Neoclytus irroratus (LeConte, 1858) i c g b
 Neoclytus jibacoense Zayas, 1975 c g
 Neoclytus jouteli Davis, 1904 i c g b
 Neoclytus leucozonus (Laporte and Gory, 1835) i
 Neoclytus longipes (Drury, 1773) i c
 Neoclytus magnus Schaeffer 1904 i c g b
 Neoclytus modestus Fall, 1907 i c g b
 Neoclytus mucronatus (Fabricius, 1775) i c b
 Neoclytus muricatulus (Kirby, 1837) c g b
 Neoclytus nubilus Linsley, 1933 i c g
 Neoclytus pallidicornis Fisher, 1932 c g
 Neoclytus peninsularis Schaeffer, 1905 c g
 Neoclytus personatus Chemsak & Linsley, 1974 c g
 Neoclytus podagricus (White, 1855) c g
 Neoclytus provoanus Casey, 1924 i c g
 Neoclytus pubicollis Fisher, 1932 c g
 Neoclytus purus Bates, 1885 c g
 Neoclytus pusillus (Castelnau & Gory, 1841) c g
 Neoclytus resplendens Linsley, 1935 i c g b
 Neoclytus rufitarsis (Chevrolat, 1860) c g
 Neoclytus rufus (Olivier, 1795) c g
 Neoclytus scutellaris (Olivier, 1790) i c g b
 Neoclytus senilis (Fabricius, 1798) c g
 Neoclytus smithi Bates, 1892 c g
 Neoclytus steelei Chemsak & Linsley, 1978 c g
 Neoclytus tenuiscriptus Fall, 1907 i c g b (seepwillow borer)
 Neoclytus torquatus LeConte, 1873 i c g b
 Neoclytus unicolor (Castelnau & Gory, 1841) c g
 Neoclytus vanduzeei Van Dyke, 1927 i c g b
 Neoclytus vitellinus Martins & Galileo, 2008 c g
 Neoclytus ypsilon Chevrolat, 1862 c g
 Neoclytus zonatus Martins & Galileo, 2008 c g

Data sources: i = ITIS, c = Catalogue of Life, g = GBIF, b = Bugguide.net

Gallery

References

 
Clytini